East Deep Creek is a stream tributary to Deep Creek in Tooele County, Utah.

From there it flows north northeast to its confluence with  
West Deep Creek to form Deep Creek, 0.6 miles southwest of Ibapah, at an elevation of 5,282 feet / 1,610 meters.

References 

Rivers of Tooele County, Utah